Pinos Puente is a municipality located in the province of Granada, Spain. According to the 2005 census (INE), the city has a population of 13319 inhabitants. The Cubillas River runs by the town.

Etymology

The town's name refers to pine or fir groves of which there is a small outcrop within a clearing.

Notes

Municipalities in the Province of Granada